The economics of marriage includes the economic analysis of household formation and break up, of production and distribution decisions within the household. It is closely related to the law and economics of marriages and households. Grossbard-Shechtman (1999a and 1999b) identifies three approaches to the subject: the Marxist approach (Friedrich Engels (1884) and Himmelweit and Mohun (1977)), the neo-classical approach (Gary Becker (1974)) and the game theoretic approaches (Marilyn Manser, Murray Brown, Marjorie McElroy and Mary Jane Horney). Marital status has a positive influence on economic status. There is a marriage prime for males that the wage of married males is 15% higher than the wage of never married male. The Uniform Marital Property Act issued clause on the distribution of marital property and individual property. The Uniform Premarital Agreements Act offers clauses to guide two spouses to make an agreement on distribution of rights and obligations before marriage.

Economic Origins of Marriage

Richard Wrangham puts forward the view that women cooking for men is fundamental to marriage in hunter-gatherer societies.
Many such examples suggest that the mating system is constrained by the way species are socially adapted to their food supply.  ... The consequence of man's economic dependence takes different forms in different societies, but recall that according to Jane Collier and Michelle Rosaldo, his needing a wife to provide food is universal among hunter-gatherers. Food, it seems, routinely drives a man's marriage decision more than the need for a sexual partner.

This extends to men stealing women.  
Among the Inuit, where a woman contributed no food calories, her cooking and production of warm, dry hunting clothes were vital: a man cannot both hunt and cook. The pressure could drive widowers or bachelors to neighboring territories in an attempt to steal a woman, even if it meant killing her husband. The problem was so pervasive that ... unfamiliar men would normally be killed even before questions were asked.  Lust was not the motivation for stealing wives.  "The vital importance of a wife to perform domestic services provided the most usual motive for abduction," according to ethnographer David Riches. 

Jeremy Greenwood and Nezih Guner (2009) argue that technological progress in the household sector, say due to the advent of dishwashers, frozen foods, vacuum cleaners, washing machines, tupperware, etc. has reduced the need for labor in the home. As a result, it is much easier to live alone. This has resulted in a smaller fraction of the population being married and a higher rate of divorce.

Benefit of Marriage
93% of employers in the United States provide health insurance to married couples.
There is marital wage premium for males, according to the survey “Summary Statistics of White Young Men Classified by Marital Status in 1976”, which was done by Korenman and Neumark, the hourly wage of married spouses present is $6.57, and hourly wage of the never married is $5.56, which was approximately 15% lower than that of  the married spouse present.

Implications On Taxes, Financials & Credit 
Before getting married all couples should have an understanding of the implications of their decisions and understand how their life commitment impacts them financially.

Tax Pros and Cons Under New Tax Law
The Tax Cuts and Jobs Act of 2017 (TCJA) balances things out for most taxpayers by restructuring the tax brackets. Currently and through 2025 when the TCJA expires unless Congress renews it, the income perimeters for all tax brackets except one are double those for single filers.

Assume a couple were each earning $91,000 annually in 2017. Under the TCJA's brackets, they’d each fall into the new 24% range if they didn't marry and they filed single returns.

And if they married? They’d fall into the new 24% range for married taxpayers who file jointly as well. And yes, that's 1% less than they would have paid before the TCJA went into effect. There's no more 25% bracket. The 24% bracket jumps to 32% at individual incomes of $157,500 and joint married incomes of $315,000—exactly double.

The highest tax bracket is down to 37% from 39.6% in 2017. This is still subject to the marriage penalty but you won't hit it until you earn more than $500,000 as a single individual or $600,000 if you're married and file jointly—not even close to double.

Congress has indicated that preserving the marriage penalty at the highest tax rate will help fund other taxpayer-friendly provisions of the TCJA so the adjustment wasn't quite made across the board.

Tax Credits and Other Issues

The marriage penalty isn't just about tax brackets. It rears its ugly head in a few other tax circumstances as well, and the TCJA does not affect all of them.

The Earned Income Tax Credit still has income limits in place and they're different depending on whether you're married or single. Marrying and combining incomes will still disqualify some lower-income couples from claiming this tax credit.

As for that itemized tax deduction for property, state, and local taxes, the TCJA caps this at $10,000 for every taxpayer whether he's single or married and filing a joint return. A couple who didn't marry could claim $20,000 in deductions on two separate returns but the married couple is limited to $10,000 on one return.

Congress argues that it can be presumed that married couples are sharing payment of these SALT taxes and two taxpayers can't both claim deductions for the same expenses. This one might not be as glaring as it appears on the surface.

The TJCA hasn't altered the 3.8% tax on net investment income, either. This tax kicks in at investment income over $250,000 for married couples filing jointly but $200,000 for individual filers. Two individuals who didn't file a joint return would have a threshold of $400,000 or $200,000 each so that marriage license leaves $150,000 on the table.

Cost of Getting Married

Average Wedding Costs 
In 2018 over 18,000 US-based weddings were researched as part of a report conducted by the WeddingWire. When all the data was consolidated they discovered that the average cost for getting married in the US was $38,700. ($5,000 Engagement Ring + $29,200 Ceremony/Reception + $4,500 Honeymoon) This report took a vast variety of items into account and pulled data from all different parts of the country where wedding costs varied significantly. It was found that Metro New York, San Francisco and Washington D.C. were the top 3 most expensive areas to get married in 2018 while Cleveland, Tampa/St. Petersburg, and Phoenix were the least expensive areas to get married on average.

Who Pays for the Wedding? 
Traditionally there has been a breakout of who pays for what at a wedding. These are mostly customary rules of thumb rather than hard guidelines a couple must follow. In the end it comes down to each couples financial situation but it is worth noting for a coupe getting married who has paid for what in a more traditional setting. Over the years the responsibility for paying for the wedding has taken a shift. Today "Generation X" (people born form 1965 to 1979) couples break out the payments for a wedding as such: 69% paid by the couples, 27% paid by the parents and 4% is paid by "other". Where as Millennial (people born from 1980 to 1994) break out the costs for a wedding today as follows: 40% paid by the couple, 51% paid by the parents and 9% paid by "other". Couples today are finding that they are funding their portion of the wedding by either dipping into their savings, finding ways to make extra money before the wedding or taking on debt.

Economic reasons not to get married 
There may be many reasons to not get married such as fear of commitment, family disapproval, genetic incompatibility, etc... However, financial reasons hold the biggest weight and especially in the older adult community. Forbes magazine article by Dan Browning, discussed several reasons why aging adults should cohabit instead of marrying. One of the things that were suggested to Browning by his financial adviser and tax accountant is that marrying late can affect health insurance of partners. An anecdote is presented by these financial advisors that considers that upon retirement at the age of 65, a spouse who was benefiting from the health insurance of their spouse's job will find it difficult to qualify for a subsidized health care plan. A second reason is that later on in life individuals are usually financially affluent hence leading to higher taxation when married and filing jointly. Browning's article gives another example of an older adult couple who married at the age of 60 but had to divorce because their tax bill increased by $40,000 due to their high individual assets.  

Continually, the cost of getting married is a major reason why many couples avoid marriage. From the above data from WeddingWire's 2019 Newlywed report in the United States, the average cost to get married is $38,700. This amount is the equivalent of the average student loan debts or a down payment on a house. Such financial investment for one day is not worth the burden. Along lines of student loans, people avoid marriage because it leads to combined student loan which leads to a higher repayment compared to when single (Hamer). Thirdly, people avoid marriage because it can affect their credit score in the event their spouse has a bad credit. Lastly but not limited to, marriage is avoided because the cost of divorce when things do not work out is expensive (see Divorce section for more details).

Legislation and reform of marriage

Uniform Marital Property Act 
Traditional asset division system stated that what a spouse owns before marriage or personal earnings during marriage are considered as separated property. Uniform Marital Property（UMPA)，a marital law that was first passed by the Uniform Law Commissioners in 1983, considered a family as an economic entity. Each spouse owns half of the marital property and their individual property, which includes property before marriage and individual income such as gifts from a third person or added value on individual property before marriage. If there is uncertainty on ownership, the property will be considered as a community property. Both spouses have the responsibility to protect their marital property.  So far, only Wisconsin has adopted UMPA, and suggestions have been made by which to revise UMPA before it is adopted in any other state.

Uniform Premarital Agreements Act
Premarital agreement is an agreement that two individuals signed to distribute marital rights and obligations of each individual during marriage, after divorce, or death of one spouse. Uniform Premarital Agreements Act (UPAA) was issued by the Uniform Law Commission (ULC) in 1983 and has been employed by 27 states. It  includes rights and duties responsible to determine when and where a premarital agreement is practicable. It requires the premarital agreement to be in writing and signed by both spouses. UPAA also record that a party must fairly disclose his or her property to another party if he or she wants to enforce the premarital agreement.
The adoption of UPAA differentiated in each individual states.

Spier (1992) has pointed out that there may be fewer prenuptial agreements than would be socially optimal. The reason is that if you ask your fiancée to sign such an agreement, you might signal that you fear that the probability of divorce will be larger than your fiancée would have thought otherwise. Smith (2003) provides a survey of the law and economics literature on marriage contracts.

Divorce 

Divorce is the other end of marriage that couples often do not go into marriage hoping to do. Although the past years rates of divorce have been decreasing as a result of individuals marrying late and rise in education, there is still a common trend of it in the lower and less educated social class. The CDC reports that of the 2,236,496 marriages 787,251 couples ended in a divorce. This means that 35 percent of marriages ended in divorce with an overall industrial worth of $50 billion yearly. The significance of this data in relation to the topic of the economy of marriage can be explained by a report given by Jay Zagorsky, the writer of Marriage and Divorce's Impact on Wealth. This report revealed that over the course of time it is more profitable to stay married than to have a divorce. According to the article by Zagorsky, “Married respondents experience per person net worth increases of 77 percent over single respondents. [While] divorced respondents’ wealth starts falling four years before divorce and they experience an average wealth drop of 77 percent.” Mary Corcoran study done in 1994 looked at the same families while they were married and when they separated. The study shows that the family income that once averaged $43,600 (married) declined to averaging $25,300. One of the causes of this contrast is that, married couples are more likely to invest because of their commitment to each other hence the reason why many are homeowners compared to their single counterparts. A second reason for this is that married couples share things together unlike separated or single individuals. As a married household there ought to be no need for multiple of the same home appliances, maybe cars, and they can divide the labour and expenses of raising children/housework. A second facet to consider when looking at divorce in relations to the economic of marriage is that of children. A study done by Julia Heath and B. F. Kiker reveal that compared to any other population single-mother headed households are susceptible to poverty. Secondary data collected for this study reports that, “changes in family structure precede poverty spells in over 99 percent of the white single-mother families…and in almost 97 percent of black families." Another study related to this data by saying, “75 percent of all women who apply for welfare benefits do so because of a disrupted marriage or a disrupted relationship in which they live with a male outside of marriage”. The parent that took the children under their possession experiences an overall decline in his/her income.

See also 

 Cost of raising a child
 Parental dividend
 Demographic economics
 Economic imperialism (economics) 
 Family economics
 Hypergamy
 Partner effects

References

Further references 
 Becker, G. (1974) "A theory of marriage", in: T. W. Schultz, ed., Economics of the family. Chicago: University of Chicago Press, 293–344.
 Engels, F (1884). The Origin of the Family, Private Property, and the State: in the light of the researches of Lewis H. Morgan is a historical materialist treatise.
 Himmelweit, S. and Mohun, S. (1977) “Domestic Labor and Capital.” Cambridge Journal of Economics vol 1:15–31.
 Manser, Marilyn and Murray Brown (1980). "Marriage and Household Decision Making: a Bargaining Analysis." International Economic Review 21:31–44.
 McElroy, Marjorie B. and M.J. Horney (1981). "Nash Bargained Household Decisions: Toward a Generalization of the Theory of Demand." International Economic Review 22:333–49.

Family economics
Demographic economics